Jimmy Collinson (1876 - March 1940) was an English footballer. He was born in Prestwich. Originally a full-back with the reserves of Newton Heath. Later had more success as a goalscoring inside forward. His debut came on 16 November 1895 against Lincoln City. He scored 17 goals in 71 league and cup appearances for Newton Heath.

References

External links
MUFCInfo.com profile

1876 births
People from Prestwich
English footballers
Manchester United F.C. players
1940 deaths
Association football fullbacks
Association football inside forwards